Ranjit or Renjith may refer to:

Religion
 Anton Ranjith Pillainayagam (born 1966), Sri Lankan Tamil Catholic priest, Auxiliary Bishop of the Archdiocese of Colombo
 Malcolm Ranjith (born 1947), Sri Lankan Cardinal of the Roman Catholic Church, Cardinal-Archbishop of Colombo, Sri Lanka

Politics
 Ranjith Aluvihare (born 1958), Sri Lankan politician
 Ranjith Bandara (born 1961), Sri Lankan politician
 Ranjith Siyambalapitiya, Sri Lankan Minister of State Revenue and Finance and Deputy Minister of Finance and Planning

Arts
 Ranjith (director), a popular Indian screenwriter and film director in Malayalam cinema
 Ranjith (singer), Indian playback singer who originally hails from Kerala
 Ranjith (actor), character artist who appears in Tamil, Telugu and Malayalam language films
 Ranjith Sankar, Indian screenwriter and film director in Malayalam cinema
 Ranjith Bajpe Tulu Movie Director known for First International Tulu Movie Nirel and Tulu Movie Dhand
 Pa. Ranjith, Tamil film director

Sports
 Ranjith Amunugama (born 1969), former Sri Lankan cricketer
 Ranjith Kumar Jayaseelan, Indian Athlete
 Ranjith Madurasinghe (born 1961), Sri Lankan cricketer
 Renjith Maheshwary (born 1986), Indian triple jumper

See also
 Ranjit

Indian unisex given names
Sinhalese masculine given names